Sekou Camara (born 1959) is a Guinean middle-distance runner. He competed in the men's 800 metres at the 1980 Summer Olympics.

References

1959 births
Living people
Athletes (track and field) at the 1980 Summer Olympics
Guinean male middle-distance runners
Olympic athletes of Guinea
Place of birth missing (living people)